Agnes of Bavaria (1335 – 11 November 1352) was a Bavarian nun from Munich and a member of the House of Wittelsbach.

The daughter of Louis IV, Holy Roman Emperor, was brought up in a monastery of Clarissan nuns. She rejected a marriage with a nobleman chosen by her relatives and instead entered a cloister. Always sickly, Agnes died in 1352.

See also

References

1335 births
1352 deaths
House of Wittelsbach
Nobility from Munich
14th-century German nuns
Children of Louis IV, Holy Roman Emperor
Daughters of kings